Evy Van Damme (born 29 March 1980) is a racing cyclist who was born in Lokeren, Belgium. She is a multiple national champion and has competed in many international events. Evy is the older sister of cyclist Charlotte Van Damme and is the former wife of former professional cyclist Nick Nuyens. Together they have three sons: Sting, Sterre and Storm.

Palmarès

1998
3rd Belgian National Road Race Championships - Junior

1999
3rd Belgian National Time Trial Championships

2000
1st  Belgian National Road Race Championships
3rd Belgian National Time Trial Championships

2001
1st  Belgian National Road Race Championships

2002
2nd Belgian National Time Trial Championships
2nd European Road Race Championships, U23

2003
1st  Belgian National Time Trial Championships

References

External links
Archive of www.evyvandamme.be, 2005 official fansite

1980 births
Living people
Belgian female cyclists
People from Lokeren
Cyclists from East Flanders